Pescopagano is a town and comune in the province of Potenza, in the region of Basilicata (southern Italy). It is bounded by the comuni of Cairano, Calitri, Castelgrande, Castelnuovo di Conza, Conza della Campania, Laviano, Rapone, Sant'Andrea di Conza, Santomenna.

Main sights

Torre dell'Orologio (Watch Tower), built on the ancient Porta Sibilla (Sybil's Gate) of the walls. It houses a Roman bust of Ianus.
Il castello (the Castle) was more properly an ancient fortress under Conza.  
Church of San Giovanni Battista (970).
Church of Montemauro.
Church of San Leonardo.
Church of SS. Annunziata.
Church of San Lorenzo in Tufara and adjacent abbey ruins.
Church of SS. Incoronata.
Church of Madonna delle Grazie (once dedicated to Saint Antony).

References

External links
Official website

Cities and towns in Basilicata